Elkhart Township may refer to:

Illinois
 Elkhart Township, Logan County, Illinois

Indiana
 Elkhart Township, Elkhart County, Indiana
 Elkhart Township, Noble County, Indiana

Iowa
 Elkhart Township, Polk County, Iowa

Missouri
 Elkhart Township, Bates County, Missouri

Township name disambiguation pages